Daniel Johnson (born May 7, 1955) is a former linebacker in the National Football League. Johnson was drafted in the fourth round of the 1978 NFL Draft by the Kansas City Chiefs. He would play that season with the Green Bay Packers.

References

People from Bedford County, Tennessee
Green Bay Packers players
American football linebackers
Tennessee State Tigers football players
1955 births
Living people